John William Londrigan (3 February 1890 – 22 August 1937) was an Australian rules football player from South Australia.

Sturt (1907–1910) 
Initially Londrigan played for the Sturt Football Club but after strong rumours that University would soon be admitted to the SAFL, thereby eliminating the bye, he left the club.

Adelaide University (1911) 
However, after it became apparent that University would not be admitted to the SAFL he left to join the Port Adelaide Football Club in 1912.

Port Adelaide (1912–1914) 

Impressing in his first year he was appointed captain in 1912. Subsequently he was captain of the 1913 and 1914 Port Adelaide Football Club side who were one of the sports greatest ever teams. He is the only player to twice captain victorious Champions of Australia teams. His career ended with the onset of World War I.

References

Australian rules footballers from South Australia
Port Adelaide Football Club (SANFL) players
Port Adelaide Football Club players (all competitions)
Sturt Football Club players
1890 births
1937 deaths
Port Adelaide Football Club (SANFL) coaches